Johannes Brahms (1833–1897) was a German composer and pianist.

Brahms may also refer to:

Brahms (surname), a list of notable people with the surname
Brahms (crater), a crater on Mercury
1818 Brahms, main-belt asteroid
Brahms, 2015 French graphic novel by Jul Maroh
Brahms: The Boy II, a 2020 horror film

See also

Brahm (disambiguation)
Brahman (disambiguation)
Abrams (disambiguation)
Braum's, a chain of fast-food restaurants and grocery stores